Olivia Ragnaghnewendé Rouamba  is a Burkina Faso politician who has been the nation's Minister of Foreign Affairs since March 2022.

Education
Rouamba has a doctorate in international relations.

Career
Rouamba worked Director General of Bilateral Cooperation and was Second Counselor at Burkina Faso's embassy in South Africa. On 15 September 2021 Rouamba was appointed by the Council of Ministers as Burkina Faso's ambassador to Ethiopia, as well as Permanent Representative to the African Union and the United Nations Economic Commission for Africa.

Rouamba was appointed Minister for Foreign Affairs by interim President Paul-Henri Sandaogo Damiba on 5 March 2022 as part of the transitional government following the January coup. She was installed in Ouagadougou on 11 March 2022. In her speech upon taking office, she said "Dear collaborators, I refuse to be traitors, we will refuse to be traitors and we will accomplish this mission with abnegation."

In March and again in April, she said that a three year transition period back to democracy proposed by the military junta was "realistic". In July, she said that the two-year period had been suggested by the nation's junta rather than imposed by ECOWAS "as some are saying on the internet." On 15 July, United Nations Peacebuilding Commission Chair Rahab Fatima met with Rouamba, affirming the ECOWAS timetable and strongly encouraging Burkina Faso to "swiftly implement ... a peaceful and inclusive transition process with respect for human rights, justice and the rule of law."

References

External links
 Government profile
 Olivia Rouamba, the juntas' favourite foreign minister, Africa Intelligence, December 23, 2022 (requires free registration)

Living people
21st-century Burkinabé people
Foreign ministers of Burkina Faso
Female foreign ministers
Women government ministers of Burkina Faso
Year of birth missing (living people)